Christian Muck is an Austrian chess player. He won the 31st World Correspondence Chess Championship in 2022.

References 

Year of birth missing (living people)
Living people
Austrian chess players
21st-century Austrian people
World Correspondence Chess Champions
Place of birth missing (living people)